The following is a list of school districts in Nebraska:

Nebraska school district classification
Nebraska public school districts are divided into four classes:
Class 3 (district has 1 to 499,999 inhabitants)
Class 4 (district has more than 100,000 inhabitants in primary cities; Lincoln Public Schools is the only district in this class)
Class 5 (district has more than 200,000 inhabitants in metropolitan cities; Omaha Public Schools is the only district in this class)
Class 8 (State-operated school districts)

Three additional classes of Nebraska school districts, Class 1 (grades K-8; affiliated with one or more Class 2-5 districts and/or joined with a Class 6 district for tax purposes) and Class 6 (grades 6–12; was joined with one or more Class 1 districts) were dissolved on June 15, 2006, and Class 2 (district has 1,000 or fewer inhabitants) was dissolved in 2018.

All unlabeled districts on this list are class 3; others will be specified.

History
The highest number of school districts the state ever had was over 7,000. In 1921 the state legislature passed a law that caused the first wave of school district consolidation. Increased highway transportation and a desire for a strong education in all parts of the state prompted more consolidations. After the law passed 5% of the area school districts closed or merged up to World War II. 6,604 school districts remained in the 1950-1951 school year.

Post-World War II de-ruralization meant that school district populations declined further, with a large number consolidated in the 1950s and 1960s.

In 1990 there were 812 school districts. In 2004 this was down to 501, and later that year the number of school districts went below 500.

List of schools 

 Valentine Community Schools   
 Gordon-Rushville Public Schools   
 Sioux County Public Schools   
 Garden County Schools   
 Hyannis Area Schools   
 Mullen Public Schools    
 Ainsworth Community Schools    
 Dundy County Public Schools   
 Rock County Public Schools   
 Hemingford Public Schools   
 Sandhills Public Schools   
 West Holt Public Schools   
 Alliance Public Schools    
 McPherson County Schools   
 Perkins County Schools    
 Banner County Public Schools   
 Keya Paha County Schools   
 Chase County Schools    
 Arthur County Schools   
 Thedford Public Schools   
 Chadron Public Schools   
 Kimball Public Schools    
 Bridgeport Public Schools    
 Southwest Public Schools   
 O'Neill Public Schools   
 Wheeler Central Schools   
 Stapleton Public Schools   
 Nebraska Unified District   
 Southern Valley Schools   
 Creek Valley Schools   
 Loup County Public Schools   
 Cody-Kilgore Public Schools   
 Burwell Public Schools   
 Hayes Center Public Schools   
 Leyton Public Schools   
 Ogallala Public Schools   
 Potter-Dix Public Schools    
 South Central Nebraska School District   
 Anselmo-Merna Public Schools   
 Broken Bow Public Schools   
 Wallace Public School District   
 Arnold Public Schools   
 Wauneta-Palisade Public Schools   
 Ord Public Schools   
 West Boyd Public Schools   
 Callaway Public Schools   
 Boone Central Schools   
 Humboldt Table Rock Steinauer Public Schools   
 Maywood Public Schools   
 Hitchcock County School System   
 Eustis-Farnam Public Schools   
 Paxton Consolidated Schools   
 Fairbury Public Schools   
 Chambers Public Schools   
 Loup City Public Schools   
 Crawford Public Schools   
 South Platte Public Schools   
 Hershey Public Schools   
 Minden Public Schools   
 Franklin Public Schools   
 Adams Central Public Schools   
 Maxwell Public Schools   
 Centennial Public Schools   
 Gothenburg Public Schools   
 Arapahoe Public Schools   
 Medicine Valley Public Schools   
 Sumner-Eddyville-Miller Schools   
 Hay Springs Public Schools   
 David City Public Schools   
 Falls City Public Schools   
 Schuyler Community Schools   
 Sargent Public Schools   
 Twin Rivers Public Schools   
 Silver Lake Public Schools   
 Greeley-Wolbach Public Schools   
 Sidney Public Schools   
 Sutherland Public Schools   
 Johnson County Central Public Schools   
 Wilcox-Hildreth Public Schools   
 Thayer Central Community Schools

ESU #1

Cedar County

Hartington-Newcastle Public Schools #8
Laurel-Concord-Coleridge Public Schools #54
Randolph Public Schools #45
Wynot Public Schools #101

Dakota County

Homer Community Schools #31
South Sioux City Community Schools #11

Dixon County

Allen Consolidated Schools #70
Emerson-Hubbard Public Schools #561
Ponca Public Schools #1

Knox County

Bloomfield Community Schools #586
Creighton Public Schools #13
Crofton Community Schools #96
Niobrara Public Schools #501
Santee Community Schools #505
Verdigre Public Schools #583
Wausa Public Schools #576

Thurston County

Pender Public Schools #1
Umo N Ho N Nation Public Schools #16
Walthill Public Schools #13
Wauneta-Palisade Public Schools
Winnebago Public Schools #17

Wayne County

Wakefield Public Schools #560
Wayne Community Schools #17
Winside Public Schools #595

ESU #2

Burt County

Lyons-Decatur Northeast Schools #20
Oakland-Craig Public Schools #14
Tekamah-Herman Community Schools #1

Cuming County

Bancroft-Rosalie Community Schools #20
West Point Public Schools #1
Wisner-Pilger Public Schools #30

Dodge County

Fremont Public Schools #1
Logan View Public Schools #594
North Bend Central Schools #595
Scribner-Snyder Community Schools #62

Lancaster County
Raymond Central Schools #161

Saunders County

Ashland-Greenwood Schools #1
Cedar Bluffs Public Schools #107
Mead Public Schools #72
Wahoo Public Schools #39
Yutan Public Schools #9

ESU #3

Cass County

Conestoga Public Schools #56
Elmwood-Murdock Public Schools #97
Louisville Public Schools #32
Plattsmouth Community Schools #1
Weeping Water Public Schools #22

Douglas County

Bennington Public Schools #59
Douglas County West Community Schools #15
Elkhorn Public Schools #10
Millard Public Schools #17
Ralston Public Schools #54
Westside Community Schools #66

Sarpy County

Bellevue Public Schools #1
Gretna Public Schools #37
Papillion-La Vista Public Schools #27
Springfield Platteview Community Schools #46

Washington County

Arlington Public Schools #24
Blair Community Schools #1
Fort Calhoun Community Schools #3

ESU #4

Johnson County

Johnson County Central Public Schools #50
Sterling Public Schools #33

Nemaha County

Auburn Public Schools #29
Johnson-Brock Public Schools #23

Otoe County

Nebraska City Public Schools #11
Palmyra District #501
Syracuse-Dunbar-Avoca Schools #27

Pawnee County

Lewiston Consolidated Schools #69
Pawnee City Public Schools #1

Richardson County

Falls City Public Schools #56
Humboldt/Table Rock Steinauer #70

ESU #5

Gage County

Beatrice Public Schools #15
Diller-Odell Public Schools #100
 Freeman Public Schools #34
Southern School District 1

Jefferson County

Fairbury Public Schools #8
Meridian Public Schools #303
Tri-County Public Schools #300

Thayer County

Bruning-Davenport Unified System #1
Deshler Public Schools #60
Thayer Central Community Schools #70

ESU #6

Fillmore County

Exeter-Milligan Public Schools #1
Fillmore Central Public Schools #25
Shickley Public Schools #54

Lancaster County

Malcolm Public Schools #148
Norris School District 160 
Waverly School District 145

Saline County

Crete Public Schools #2
Dorchester Public Schools #44
Friend Public Schools #68
Wilber-Clatonia Public Schools #82

Seward County

Centennial Public Schools #567
 Milford Public Schools #5
Seward Public Schools #9

York County

Heartland Community School #96
McCool Junction Public Schools #83
York Public Schools #12

ESU #7

Boone County

Boone Central Schools #1
St. Edward Public Schools #17

Butler County

David City Public Schools #56
East Butler Public Schools #502

Colfax County

Clarkson Public Schools #58
Howells-Dodge Consolidated Schools #70
Leigh Community Schools #39
Schuyler Community Schools #123

Merrick County

Central City Public Schools #4
Palmer Public Schools #49

Nance County

Fullerton Public Schools #1
Twin River Public Schools #30

Platte County

Columbus Public Schools #1
Humphrey Public Schools #67
Lakeview Community Schools #5

Polk County

Cross County Community Schools #15
High Plains Community Schools #75
Osceola Public Schools #19
Shelby-Rising City Public Schools #32

ESU #8

Antelope County

Elgin Public Schools #18
Neligh-Oakdale Schools #9
Summerland Public Schools #115

Boyd County
Boyd County Unified #51

Holt County

Chambers Public Schools #137
O'Neill Public Schools #7
Stuart Public Schools #44
Summerland Public Schools
West Holt Public Schools #239

Madison County

Battle Creek Public Schools #5
Elkhorn Valley Schools #80
Madison Public Schools #1
Newman Grove Public Schools #13
Norfolk Public Schools #2

Pierce County

Osmond Public Schools #542
Pierce Public Schools #2
Plainview Public Schools #5

Stanton County
Stanton Community Schools #3

Wheeler County
Wheeler Central Schools #45

ESU #9

Adams County

Adams Central Schools #90
Hastings Public Schools #18
Kenesaw Public Schools #3
Silver Lake Public Schools #123

Clay County

Harvard Public Schools #11
Sutton Public Schools #2

Hall County
Doniphan-Trumbull Public Schools #126

Hamilton County

Aurora Public Schools #504
Giltner Public Schools #2
Hampton Public Schools #91

Nuckolls County
South Central Nebraska Unified System 5
Superior Public Schools #11

Webster County

Blue Hill Public Schools #74
Red Cloud Community Schools #2

ESU #10

Blaine County
Sandhills Public Schools #71

Boone County
Riverside Public Schools #75

Buffalo County

Amherst Public Schools #119
Elm Creek Public Schools #9
Gibbon Public Schools #2
Kearney Public Schools #7
Pleasanton Public Schools #105
Ravenna Public Schools #69
Shelton Public Schools #19

Custer County

Anselmo-Merna Public Schools #15
Ansley Public Schools #44
Arnold Public Schools #89
Broken Bow Public Schools #25
Callaway Public Schools #180
Sargent Public Schools #84

Dawson County

Cozad City Schools #11
Gothenburg Public Schools #20
Lexington Public Schools #1
Overton Public Schools #4
Sumner-Eddyville-Miller Schools #101

Garfield County
Burwell Public Schools #100

Greeley County
Central Valley Public Schools #60

Hall County

Grand Island Public Schools #2
Northwest Public Schools #82
Wood River Rural Schools #83

Howard County

Centura Public School #100
Elba Public Schools #103
St. Paul Public Schools #1

Loup County
Loup County Public Schools #25

Sherman County

Litchfield Public Schools #15
Loup City Public Schools #1

Valley County

Arcadia Public Schools #21
Ord Public Schools #5

ESU #11

Franklin County
Franklin Public Schools #506

Frontier County
Eustis-Farnam Public Schools #95

Furnas County

Arapahoe Public Schools #18
Cambridge Public Schools #21
Southern Valley Schools #540

Gosper County
Elwood Public Schools #30

Harlan County
Alma Public Schools #2

Kearney County

Axtell Public Schools #501
Minden Public Schools #503
Wilcox-Hildreth Public Schools #1

Phelps County

Bertrand Public Schools #54
Holdrege Public Schools #44
Loomis Public Schools #55

ESU #13

Banner County
Banner County Public Schools #1

Deuel County
Creek Valley Schools #25

Box Butte County

Alliance Public Schools #6
Hemingford Public Schools #10

Cheyenne County

Leyton Public Schools #3
Potter-Dix Public Schools #9
Sidney Public Schools #1

Dawes County

Chadron Public Schools #2
Crawford Public Schools #71

Garden County
Garden County Schools #1

Kimball County
Kimball Public Schools #1

Morrill County

Bayard Public Schools #21
Bridgeport Public Schools #63

Scotts Bluff County

Gering Public Schools #16
Minatare Public Schools #2
Mitchell Public Schools #31
Morrill Public Schools #11
Scottsbluff Public Schools #32

Sheridan County

Gordon-Rushville Public Schools #10
Hay Springs Public Schools #3

Sioux County
Sioux County Schools #500

ESU #15

Chase County

Chase County Schools #10
 Wauneta-Palisade Public Schools #536

Frontier County

Maywood Public Schools #46
Medicine Valley Public Schools #125

Dundy County
Dundy County Public Schools #117

Hayes County
Hayes Center Public Schools #79

Hitchcock County
Hitchcock County Unified School System #70

Red Willow County

McCook Public Schools #17
Southwest Public Schools #179

ESU #16

Arthur County
Arthur County Schools #500

Deuel County
South Platte Public Schools #95

Grant County
Hyannis Area Schools #11

Hooker County
Mullen Public Schools #1

Keith County

Ogallala Public Schools #1
Paxton Consolidated Schools #6

Lincoln County

Brady Public Schools #6
Hershey Public Schools #37
Maxwell Public Schools #7
North Platte Public Schools #1
Sutherland Public Schools #55
Wallace Public School District #565

Logan County
Stapleton Public Schools #501

McPherson County
McPherson County Schools #90

Perkins County
Perkins County Schools #20

Thomas County
Thedford Public Schools #1

ESU #17

Brown County
Ainsworth Community Schools #10

Cherry County

Cody-Kilgore Public Schools #30
Valentine Community Schools #6

Keya Paha County
Keya Paha County Public Schools #100

Rock County
Rock County Schools #100

ESU #18

Lancaster County
Lincoln Public Schools #1 (Class 4)

ESU #19

Douglas County
Omaha Public Schools #1 (Class 5)

Former school districts

Listed by date of dissolution:

1991
 Ash Creek Public School
 Centennial Public School (#93-0073-000)
 College Hill Public School
 District 2 Keith County
 District 5 Wayne County
 District 14 Holt County
 District 15 Thurston County
 District 18 Dawson County
 District 22 Box Butte County
 District 27 Keith County
 District 34 Cuming County
 District 36 Stanton County
 District 49 Platte County
 Edison Public School
 Fairview Public School
 Gilchrist Public School
 Hillside Public School
 Inez Valley Public School
 Mascot Public School
 Memphis Public School
 New England Valley School
 Northwest Cherry Public School
 Palisade Public Schools
 Paramount Public School
 Pick Public School
 Pleasant Ridge Public School
 Pleasant Valley Public School
 Riverside Public School
 Sunnyside Public School
 Taylor Public School
 Two Rivers Public School
 Wauneta Public School
 West Olive Public School
 Willis Public School
 Willow Creek Public School

1992
 District 16 Box Butte County 
 Happy Dale Public School 
 Prairie Bell School

1993
 District 40 Box Butte County 
 Log Pine Public School

1994
 District 1 Box Butte County

1997
 Willowdale Public School

1998
 District 65 Box Butte County
 District 74 Boone County
 Pleasant Valley Public School
 Wilson Public School

1999
 District 49 Boone County 
 Triangle Public School

2000
 Petersburg Public Schools

2001
 Beaver Valley Public School

2002
 Johnstown Public School
 Leader Public School

2003
 Hanover Public School
 Plum Center Public School

2004
 Dawson-Verdon Public Schools 
 Unified Niobrara-Lynch

2005
 Center Valley Public School
 Rising Star Public School

2006
 Abie Public School
 Arthur Elementary School 
 Ayr Public School 
 Brownlee Public School
 Buffalo Flats Public School
 Center Public School
 Crookston Public School
 District 15 Adams County 
 District 39 Box Butte County 
 District 42 Box Butte County 
 District 44 Box Butte County 
 District 45 Cherry County 
 District 65 Buffalo County 
 District 83 Cherry County 
 Eastpoint Public School
 Elm Creek Public School
 Elsmere Public School 
 Evergreen Public School
 Garfield Public School
 Irwin Public School
 Highland Grove Public Schools 
 Holstein Public School
 Juniata Elementary School
 Kewanee Public School
 Manley Public School
 Merriman Public School
 Odessa Public School
 Pioneer Public School
 Pleasant Hill Public School
 Raven Public School 
 Riverdale Public School
 Shell Creek Public School 
 Simeon Public School
 South Akron Public School
 Sparks Public School
 Stone Public School
 Stull Public School
 Sunnyside Public School 
 Tri-View Public School 
 Valentine City Schools
 Valley View Public School
 Wallace Public School 
 Wood Lake Public School

2007
 Butte Public Schools 
 Nemaha Valley Schools 
 Spence-Napier Public Schools 
 Stratton Public Schools
 Tecumseh Public Schools 
 West Boyd Unified System

2008
 Culbertson Public Schools
 Trenton Public Schools

2009
 Southeast Nebraska Consolidated Schools

2010
 Prague Public Schools

2011
 Clay Center Public Schools
 Rising City Public Schools

2014
 Cedar Rapids Public School
 Coleridge Community Schools
 Greely-Wolbach Public Schools
 Newcastle Public Schools
 North Loup Scotia Public Schools
 Spalding Public Schools

2017
 Lynch Public Schools
 West Boyd School District

2020
 Clearwater Public Schools
 Ewing Public Schools
 Orchard Public Schools

See also
List of high schools in Nebraska
Educational Service Units of Nebraska

References

Further reading
  (PhD thesis)

External links
Nebraska Education Directory

Nebraska

School districts
School districts